José Alejandro Cardona (born March 16, 1994) is a Mexican professional baseball outfielder for the Sultanes de Monterrey of the Mexican League. He signed with the Texas Rangers as an international free agent in 2011.

Career

Texas Rangers
On March 18, 2011, Cardona signed with the Texas Rangers organization as an international free agent. He made his professional debut with the Dominican Summer League Rangers, and hit .264 in 39 games. He returned to the team in 2012 and slashed .263/.385/.332 in 69 games. In 2013, Cardona played for the DSL Rangers and the rookie-level AZL Rangers, hitting a combined .282/.351/.363 with 1 home run and 19 RBI. For the 2014 season, Cardona split the season between the AZL Rangers, the Low-A Spokane Indians, and the High-A Myrtle Beach Pelicans, batting a cumulative .306/.342/.393 with no home runs and 21 RBI in 47 games between the three teams. The following year, Cardona played in Single-A for the Hickory Crawdads, slashing .254/.317/.380 with career-highs in home runs (10) and RBI (59). In 2016, Cardona was promoted to the High-A High Desert Mavericks, and batted .300/.371/.463 with a career-high 14 home runs and 48 RBI in 101 games for the team. For the 2017 season, Cardona split the year between the Double-A Frisco RoughRiders and the Triple-A Round Rock Express, accumulating a .274/.314/.377 slash line with 7 home runs and 47 RBI between the two teams. In 2018, Cardona again split the year between Round Rock and Frisco, and also played in 3 rehab games with the AZL Rangers, recording a .254/.314/.358 batting line with 8 home runs and 33 RBI in 104 games between the three levels. On November 2, 2018, he elected free agency.

Chicago Cubs
On December 31, 2018, Cardona signed a minor league contract with the Chicago Cubs organization. He appeared in only 10 games for the rookie-level AZL Cubs before being released by the organization on July 4, 2019.

Bravos de León
On July 14, 2019, Cardona signed with the Bravos de León of the Mexican League. He finished the year with León, batting .277/.321/.317 with 1 home run and 9 RBI. Cardona did not play in a game in 2020 due to the cancellation of the Mexican League season because of the COVID-19 pandemic.

Sultanes de Monterrey
On May 19, 2021, Cardona signed with the Sultanes de Monterrey of the Mexican League. In 28 games for Campeche, Cardona slashed .291/.345/.373 with 2 home runs and 7 RBI.

Piratas de Campeche
On June 27, 2021, Cardona was loaned to the Piratas de Campeche of the Mexican League.

Sultanes de Monterrey (second stint)
On April 21, 2022, Cardona was returned back to the Sultanes de Monterrey of the Mexican League.

International career
Cardona was selected to the Mexico national baseball team at the 2020 Summer Olympics (contested in 2021).

References

External links

1994 births
Living people
Mexican expatriate baseball players in the United States
Dominican Summer League Rangers players
Mexican expatriate baseball players in the Dominican Republic
Arizona League Rangers players
Spokane Indians players
Myrtle Beach Pelicans players
Naranjeros de Hermosillo players
Hickory Crawdads players
High Desert Mavericks players
Frisco RoughRiders players
Round Rock Express players
Bravos de León players
Arizona League Cubs players
Sultanes de Monterrey players
Piratas de Campeche players
People from San Nicolás de los Garza
Baseball players from Nuevo León
Baseball players at the 2020 Summer Olympics
Olympic baseball players of Mexico
2023 World Baseball Classic players